Bhakta Prahlada is a 1983 Indian Kannada-language Hindu mythological film directed by Vijay, and based on the tale of Prahalada. The film stars Rajkumar, Saritha, Puneeth Rajkumar and Ananth Nag. The soundtrack was composed by T. G. Lingappa. The film won State Film Awards in Sound recording and cinematography categories.

This was the fourth Kannada film on Prahlada after the 1942 film Bhakta Prahlada , 1958 film Bhakta Prahlada and the 1960 film Dashavathara. Of the four films, this was the only one which was not shot in black and white. This movie was dubbed in Telugu as Narasimhaavataaram.

Cast
 Rajkumar as Hiranyakashipu
 Saritha as Kayadu
 Puneeth Rajkumar as Prahlada
 Ananth Nag as Narada
 Kanchana as Diti
 Sadashiva Brahmavar as Maharshi Kashyapa
 Srinivasa Murthy as Vishnu, Narasimha
 Gangadhar as Devendra
 Thoogudeepa Srinivas as Hiranyaksha
 Shivaram as Teacher of Prahlada
 M. S. Umesh as Teacher of Prahlada

Soundtrack

References

External links
 

1983 films
1980s Kannada-language films
Films scored by T. G. Lingappa
Films about Prahlada
Hindu devotional films
Films directed by Vijay (director)
Films based on the Bhagavata Purana